Schizolaena turkii is a plant in the family Sarcolaenaceae. It is endemic to Madagascar. It is named for the botanist Daniel Turk.

Description
The inflorescences are small and bear up to 15 flowers, each with three sepals and five pink petals.

Distribution and habitat
Schizolaena turkii is known only from the east central region of Vatovavy-Fitovinany. Its habitat is humid forest from  altitude. Some subpopulations are within Ranomafana National Park.

References

turkii
Endemic flora of Madagascar
Plants described in 1999